Joy Fanny Ridderhof (30 March 1903 in Minnesota - 19 December 1984 in Stanton, California) was an American missionary.

The youngest child of Dutch and Swedish immigrants, Ridderhof was one of the first  graduates of Columbia International University in 1923.  In 1930, she traveled to Honduras, establishing her ministry in Marcala and neighboring villages.  Forced to return to the United States to recover from malaria, she began making Spanish evangelizing recordings that she distributed to places in Latin America, including Marcala.  She was then contacted and asked to produce some Navajo recordings, Navajo speakers they would provide.  She accepted, and then she got more jobs.  This led her to form Gospel Recordings in 1939.

Gospel Recordings (later renamed Global Recordings Network) delivers the Gospel to illiterate people in Africa, South America, Asia, Australia, and Central America via hand-operated record players.  As of 2012 the company has produced recordings in 6,139 languages.

Ridderhof and Gospel Recordings are the subjects of the 2006 P.O.V. documentary The Tailenders.

References
Betty M. Hockett Catching Their Talk in a Box: The Life-Story of Joy Ridderhof  (pbk) Barclay Press, 1987.
Phyllis Thompson Capturing Voices Hodder and Stoughton Limited, London, 1978.

External links
 Global Recordings Official Site
 Audiovie Homepage Audiovie is Global Recordings in most Francophone countries.
 The Tailenders Official Site

1903 births
1984 deaths
People from Minnesota
Protestant missionaries in Honduras
American Protestant missionaries
American people of Dutch descent
American people of Swedish descent
Female Christian missionaries
Columbia International University alumni
American expatriates in Honduras
People from Stanton, California